FC Savit Mogilev was a Belarusian football club based in Mogilev. In the 2007 season they have been promoted to the Premier League. It was disbanded after the 2008 season.

History 
The team was formed in 2005 and is sometimes erroneously seen as a successor to Torpedo-Kadino Mogilev, a First League team from the same city that was disbanded in late 2005. This is, however, not the case, as the team had different owner, office, club logo, name and colours, almost entirely new squad, and was a different entity legally.

Savit finished 2nd in their first season in the Second League (2006) and was promoted to the First League. In 2007, the team won the First League and made its debut in the Premier League in 2008. After a disappointing 15th place, Savit finished in relegation zone and eventually was folded before the start of the next season.

League and Cup history

External links 
Official Website (now offline)
FC Savit at EUFO.DE
FC Savit at Football-Lineups.com

References

Defunct football clubs in Belarus
Sport in Mogilev
Association football clubs established in 2005
Association football clubs disestablished in 2009
2005 establishments in Belarus
2009 disestablishments in Belarus